Rhombodera kirbyi is a species of praying mantises in the family Mantidae, found in Timor, giving it its common name of the Timor Shield Mantis.

The kirbyi is a large species of mantis with the female reaching up to 10 cm with the male slightly smaller at 8-8.5 cm. It is found in different morphs ranging from a very pale green to a dark brown colour.

See also
List of mantis genera and species

References

K
Mantodea of Asia
Insects described in 1952